Yang Eui-yong (born 20 October 1951) is a North Korean weightlifter. He competed in the men's bantamweight event at the 1980 Summer Olympics.

References

1951 births
Living people
North Korean male weightlifters
Olympic weightlifters of North Korea
Weightlifters at the 1980 Summer Olympics
Place of birth missing (living people)
Medalists at the 1978 Asian Games
Medalists at the 1982 Asian Games
Asian Games gold medalists for North Korea
Asian Games silver medalists for North Korea
Weightlifters at the 1978 Asian Games
Weightlifters at the 1982 Asian Games
Asian Games medalists in weightlifting
20th-century North Korean people
21st-century North Korean people